Nina Mozetič (born 1983) is a Slovenian slalom canoeist who competed at the international level from 1997 to 2012.

She won a bronze medal in the K1 team event at the 2010 ICF Canoe Slalom World Championships in Tacen.

World Cup individual podiums

1 Pan American Championship counting for World Cup points

References

2010 ICF Canoe Slalom World Championships 11 September 2010 K-1 women's team final results. - accessed 11 September 2010.

Living people
Slovenian female canoeists
1983 births
Medalists at the ICF Canoe Slalom World Championships
20th-century Slovenian women
21st-century Slovenian women